The Satkula is a small stream of Saxony, Germany. The source of the Satkula is located in the village Kleinhänchen, municipality of Burkau/Porchow, Lusatia, Germany, in the Lusatian Highlands (Lausitzer Bergland). It is a right tributary of the Klosterwasser, which it joins near Räckelwitz. Satkula is a symbolic river for Sorbs in Lusatia.

See also
List of rivers of Saxony

Rivers of Saxony
Rivers of Germany